APB (short for "all-points-bulletin") is an American procedural drama that aired on Fox from February 6, to April 24, 2017. A first trailer was released on May 16, 2016.

On May 11, 2017, Fox cancelled the series after one season.

Plot
A tech billionaire makes a deal to purchase a Chicago Police district and equip it with cutting-edge technology, after witnessing the violent murder of a close friend and his company's CFO and the ineffectiveness of the police dealing with it. The story is loosely based on the 2015 New York Times Magazine article "Who Runs the Streets of New Orleans?" by David Amsden.

Cast

Main
 Justin Kirk as Gideon Reeves. Founder of a multibillion-dollar company, Reeves Industries and a genius engineer.
 Natalie Martinez as Detective Theresa Murphy. Detective at the 13th District of Chicago Police Department.
 Caitlin Stasey as Ada Hamilton. CTO of Reeves Industries and a former hacker.
 Taylor Handley as Officer Roderick Brandt. Police officer at the 13th District of Chicago and partner of Tasha Goss.
 Daniel MacPherson as Scott Murphy. Head of the mayor's task force and ex-husband of Theresa Murphy.
 Ernie Hudson as Sergeant/Captain Ned Conrad. Police captain in charge of the 13th District of Chicago police department.
 Tamberla Perry as Officer Tasha Goss. Police officer at the 13th District of Chicago and partner of Roderick Brandt.

Recurring
 Abraham Benrubi as Pete McCann. Engineer working at Reeves Industries and former wrestler
 Bryant Romo as Officer Jimmy Reyes. Rookie police officer at the 13th District of Chicago and partner of Geoff Cobb.
 William Smillie as Officer Geoff Cobb. Police officer at the 13th District of Chicago and partner of Jimmy Reyes.
 Nestor Serrano as Mayor Michael Salgado. Mayor of Chicago.
 Kim Raver as Lauren Fitch. CEO of Reeves Industries and girlfriend of Gideon Reeves.
 Ty Olwin as Danny Ragabi (DV8). Genius hacker and former friend/classmate of Ada Hamilton.
 Demetria Thomas as Sergeant Bernadette 'Bernie' Charles. Police sergeant at the 13th District of Chicago.
 Adam Mengerink as CPD Officer from District 13.

Production

Development
Fox ordered the pilot of David Slack's police procedural about a tech billionaire who purchases a troubled police precinct. Matt Nix was hired to take over as showrunner on March 24, 2016.

Casting
On February 12, 2016, Natalie Martinez was cast as Theresa Murphy. On February 22, 2016, Caitlin Stasey was cast as Ada Hamilton. On March 1, 2016, Taylor Handley was cast as Officer Roderick Brandt. On March 11, 2016, Justin Kirk and Eric Winter were cast as Gideon Reeves and Sgt. Tom Murphy respectively. On March 15, 2016, Ernie Hudson was cast as Capt. Ed Conrad.

Filming
Filming was temporarily shut down when Slack left the show over creative differences sometime before March 25, 2016, as Nix was set in charge. Fox announced that season one of the show would be shot in Chicago on May 11, 2016, and shortly thereafter, Trey Callaway was announced as co-showrunner of the series with Nix.

Episodes

Broadcast
Internationally, the series premiered in Australia on FOX8 on February 16, 2017. In New Zealand, it debuted on February 27 on TV One.

Home media release

Reception
The review aggregator website Rotten Tomatoes reported a 35% approval rating with a 4.46/10 out of 20 reviews. The website's consensus reads, "APBs reliance on high-tech gadgets at the expense of high-stakes drama makes it a cutting-edge police procedural not worth watching." Also, the review aggregator website Metacritic gave the series "mixed or average reviews" with a score of 45 (out of 100) based on 18 critics.

Ratings

See also
COPS (animated TV series)

References

Further reading

External links
 

2017 American television series debuts
2017 American television series endings
2010s American crime drama television series
2010s American LGBT-related drama television series
2010s American police procedural television series
English-language television shows
Fictional portrayals of the Chicago Police Department
Fox Broadcasting Company original programming
Serial drama television series
Television series by 20th Century Fox Television
Television shows filmed in Illinois
Television shows set in Chicago
Works based on periodical articles